Euclides Rojas (born August 25, 1967) is a Cuban-born coach and player development official in Major League Baseball. He was most recently the bullpen coach of the Pittsburgh Pirates.

Career
Rojas was a right-handed relief pitcher in his playing days. He was the Cuban National Team's all-time leader in saves before he and 12 others left their homeland by raft in 1994, were rescued by the United States Coast Guard, and eventually emigrated to the United States. Rojas played independent league baseball in 1995 before being acquired by the Florida Marlins in his adopted city of Miami. Rojas pitched for two seasons in the Marlins' system — including service with the Triple-A Charlotte Knights  for eight games — before injuries ended his active career. He won four games and lost six, appearing in 29 games with an earned run average of 4.56. He batted right-handed and stood 6 feet (1.83 m) tall and weighed 210 pounds (95 kg) as an active player.

In 1997, he became a full-time coach in the Marlins' system, a post that he held through . In 1999, he was briefly a member of the Marlins' MLB coaching staff, serving as interim bullpen coach.

Rojas spent six seasons (2005–) as the Pirates' Latin American field coordinator of instruction. He was the bullpen coach of the Boston Red Sox during the full seasons of 2003–2004, a period during which the Red Sox went to Game 7 of the 2003 American League Championship Series and won the 2004 American League pennant and the 2004 World Series.

See also
 List of baseball players who defected from Cuba

References

External links

1967 births
Living people
Sportspeople from Havana
Defecting Cuban baseball players
Boston Red Sox coaches
Charlotte Knights players
Florida Marlins coaches
Gulf Coast Marlins players
Major League Baseball bullpen coaches
Palm Springs Suns players
Pittsburgh Pirates coaches
Portland Sea Dogs players
Pan American Games gold medalists for Cuba
Baseball players at the 1991 Pan American Games
Pan American Games medalists in baseball
Goodwill Games medalists in baseball
Competitors at the 1990 Goodwill Games
Medalists at the 1991 Pan American Games